Giuseppe Motta (29 December 1871 – 23 January 1940) was a Swiss politician. He was a member of the Swiss Federal Council (1911–1940) and President of the League of Nations (1924–1925). He was a Catholic-conservative foreign minister and a staunch opponent of communism and Stalinism.

Biography
He was born on 29 December 1871. He was elected to the Federal Council of Switzerland on 14 December 1911. Motta served 28 years in the Federal Council, the third longest tenure to date. He was affiliated with the Christian Democratic People's Party of Switzerland.

While in office he headed the Department of Finance (1912–1919) and the Political Department (1920–1940). He was President of the Confederation five times, in 1915, 1920, 1927, 1932 and 1937.

Motta was involved with the Federal Council Felix Calonder in Switzerland's accession to the League of Nations. On 16 May 1920, Switzerland joined the League of Nations. In 1924, he presided League of Nations Assembly. At his suggestion, Switzerland was one of the few states against accepting Soviet Union to the League of Nations. He was one of the most outspoken advocates of admission of Germany. In the interwar period, he pleaded for a partial departure from Swiss neutrality principle, but spoke out from 1938 in the face of the looming Second World War again for its strict observance.

He died in office on 23 January 1940.

Commemoration
Among others, via Giuseppe Motta in Lugano, Chiasso, Minusio and Massagno, Piazza Giuseppe Motta in Ascona and Avenue Giuseppe-Motta in Geneva are named for him.

His portrait was painted twice in the late 1930s by the Swiss-born American artist Adolfo Müller-Ury. The first, a large three-quarter portrait, dated 1938, hangs in the Archivio Cantonale in Bellinzona; the artist was sent a photograph by Motta at the end of 1937, and then the artist travelled to Berne in the summer of 1938 to work on the portrait from life. The second portrait, half-length seated at a desk and dated 1939, in the Haus Muller-Lombardi in Hospental, Switzerland as part of the Adolfo Muller-Ury Stiftung. This was exhibited at the artist's last exhibition at French and Co, New York in the Spring of 1947 and returned to Switzerland after his death in July that year.

Annually since 2004, the Geneva Institute for Democracy and Development presents the Giuseppe Motta Medal to people from any country or region of the world for exceptional achievement in the promotion of peace and democracy, human rights and sustainable development.

References

External links

 

1871 births
1940 deaths
People from Airolo
Swiss Roman Catholics
Christian Democratic People's Party of Switzerland politicians
Members of the Federal Council (Switzerland)
Finance ministers of Switzerland
Members of the National Council (Switzerland)
Swiss anti-communists
Foreign ministers of Switzerland